The Scania K series is a series of chassis in Scania's city bus and coach range with longitudinally, straight-up mounted engine at the rear, replacing the K- (K94, K114, K124) and L-type (L94) chassis of the 4 series. The K series was first presented on Busworld 2005 in Kortrijk, Belgium, and models were available from 2006.

Type designation breakdown
Plant at which the vehicle was assembled (integral buses only)
 C: former Kapena plant, Slupsk, Poland (K UB, K UA)
 L: Lahden Autokori plant, Lahti, Finland – Interlink and OmniExpress (K UB, K IB, K EB)
 T: Higer plant, China – A30 and A808 Touring coaches (K EB chassis only)

Engine location
 K: chassis with centrally mounted longitudinal engine behind rearmost axle
Power code
Approximation of the power rating in hp to the nearest ten. The power code has spaces on both sides.

Type of transport
 E: coach, long distance, high comfort
 I: intercity, short to long distance, normal comfort
 U: urban, short distance, normal comfort

Chassis adaption
 A: articulated bus
 B: normal bus
 D: double-decker bus

Wheel configuration
 4x2: two-axle bus
 6x2: tri-axle bus
 6x2/2: tri-axle articulated bus
 6x2*4: tri-axle bus with steered tag axle
 8x2: quad-axle bus (K IB in Latin America only)
 8x2/2: quad-axle articulated bus (K IA only)

Chassis height
 L: low front, normal rear
 M: low front and middle, normal rear (K UA only)
 N: normal front and rear

Suspension
 B: air suspension front and rear, rigid front axle
 I: air suspension front and rear, independent front suspension

K230UB4x2LB would be a two-axle "low entry" city bus, while K480EB6x2*4NI would be a tri-axle long-distance coach with a steerable tag axle.

Note: One might think that double-decker coaches are designated as (e.g.) K 440 ED6x2*4NI. But they still use K EB for some reason.

Engines
When introduced, the K series was available with Euro IV-compliant 8.9-litre (8867 cc) 5-cylinder engines (DC9) with output of 230 hp (1050 Nm), 270 hp (1250 Nm) and 310 hp (1550 Nm) as well as the 11.7-litre (11705 cc) 6-cylinder engines (DC12) with output of 340 hp (1700 Nm), 380 hp (1900 Nm), 420 hp (2100 Nm) or 470 hp (2200 Nm), the latter being a DT12 turbo-compound engine. For the 5- and 6-cylinder engines Scania is using exhaust gas recirculation (EGR) and selective catalytic reduction (SCR) systems to fulfill the legal Euro emission standards.

In 2008 Scania released upgraded Euro V engines in order to meet these regulations. The 5-cylinder DC9 (later DC09) engines featured a larger bore and displace 9.3-litres (9291  cc) instead of 8.9-litres. The new DC13 engines feature both a larger bore and a longer stroke and therefore displace 12.7-litres (12742  cc) instead of 11.7-litres. Some engines also received slight performance improvements, for example the DC9 engine that outputs 310 hp (1550 Nm) was upgraded to 320 hp (1600 Nm).

With the introduction of Euro VI engines in 2013, the DC09 outputs 250 hp (1250 Nm), 280 hp (1400 Nm), 320 hp (1600 Nm) and 360 hp (1700 Nm), while the DC13 outputs 410 hp (2150 Nm), 450 hp (2350 Nm) and 490 hp (2550 Nm). Euro III, IV and V engines are still available for export markets.

For alternative fuels, the 9.3-litre was available as the OC9 CNG engine with power outputs of 270 hp (1100 Nm) and 305 hp (1250 Nm), which from the introduction of Euro VI was replaced by the OC09 with power outputs of 280 hp (1350 Nm) and 340 hp (1600 Nm). The 8.9-litre is available as the ethanol fueled DC9 E02 with a power output of 270 hp (1200 Nm).

Scania K EB

The K280EB, K310EB, K320EB, K340EB, K360EB, K380EB, K400EB, K410EB, K420EB, K440EB, K450EB, K470EB, K480EB and K490EB chassis have independent front suspension and are used for top end coaches. (4x2, 6x2 and 6x2*4).

Scania K IA

The K310IA is an articulated intercity bus chassis available in Latin America as 6x2/2 and 8x2/2.

One K340IA 6x2/2 and 107 K320IA 6x2/2 are operated for TransJakarta, with the K340IA unit and 51 K320IA units self-operated by TransJakarta management and 56 K320IA units owned and operated by PT. Mayasari Bakti. All units uses OC09 CNG engines that fulfill Euro VI emission standard.

Scania K IB
The K250IB, K270IB, K280IB, K310IB, K320IB, K340IB, K360IB, K380IB, K400IB, K410IB, and K420IB are the intercity bus variants but are also used for coaches. Available as 4x2, 6x2, 6x2*4 and 8x2.

Scania K UA

The K310UA, K320UA, and K360UA are the articulated (6x2/2) city bus variant which can be ordered with the two stronger 9-litre diesel engine variants or the strongest 9-litre CNG engine variant.

Sydney Buses currently has one K310UA (Fleet No. 2111) in service on Metrobus Route 10, plying between Maroubra Junction and Leichhardt via CBD.

In Adelaide (as of the late September 2022), Torrens Transit currently have 96 K320UA units (831–850, 1101–1119, 1121–1166, 1170–1181), plus 19 K360UAs (803, 805–808, 851–853, 857, 1182–1189, 1849–1850). In addition, Torrens Transit has one K310UA unit (1015) which was used as an initial trial bus on the O-Bahn. SouthLink currently has 10 K360UA units (3370–3379). Busways has 3 K360UAs (2859-2860, 2864).

Scania K UB
The K230UB, K250UB, K270UB, K280UB, K305UB (CNG), K310UB, K320UB, and K360UB are the rigid (4x2 or 6x2*4) city bus variant which can be ordered with all 9-litre engines. A pair of K380UB 6x2*4 with the 11.7-litre engine has also been made for a customer in Norway.

Australia

Numerous bus operators in Australia operate the Scania K-series chassis.

In Melbourne, CDC Melbourne, Transdev Melbourne and Ventura Bus Lines all operate fleets of K230UBs. In Geelong, CDC Geelong operates a number of K230UBs and McHarry's Buslines also operate a number of K270UBs, K270IBs, K280UBs, K280IBs, K320IBs and one K310IB.

In New South Wales, Busways and ComfortDelGro Australia's Hillsbus and Hunter Valley Buses subsidiaries have significant numbers of K230UB, K280UB and K310UB in their fleet. Transdev NSW also operates a fleet of K230UB, Transit Systems NSW operates the K280UB, K94UB and the K310UB while State Transit operate K280UB & K310UB.

In Canberra, ACTION operates over 150 K320UBs, including 26 Euro V K320UB 6x2*4 buses.

In Adelaide (as of late September 2022), Torrens Transit currently have 114 K230UB units, 101 K280UB units, 182 K320UB units, including well as 13 K320UB Hybrid diesel/electric buses. SouthLink currently has 13 K230UB units plus 3 K320 hybrid units, and Busways has 23 K230UBs, 20 K280UBs and 8 K320UB including 3 hybrids.

In Brisbane, Transport for Brisbane operate fleets of K310UB6x2. Bus Queensland (Park Ridge Transit, Westside Bus Company) and Mt Gravatt Bus Service have significant numbers of K230UB, K270IB, K280UB, K310UB and K320UB in their fleet. , Hornibrook Bus Lines subsidiaries have significant numbers of the K230UB, K280UB and K320UB.

Hong Kong

In 2008, Kowloon Motor Bus purchased 30 Scania K230UBs with Euro IV engines and Caetano City Gold body, 20 of which were 10.6m and the remainder were 12m in length. All were delivered in 2009.

The twenty 10.6m versions of K230UBs have been registered between April and June 2009 and known as the ASB class. After undergoing tests, the first few units were finally introduced on route 2C plying between Yau Yat Tsuen and Tsim Sha Tsui on Sunday, 24 May 2009. Some other buses have also been introduced on suburban routes, such as route 7M & 24.

The ten 12m versions of K230UBs have also been registered between June and August 2009 and known as the ASC class.

A further 20 K230UBs of 12m length were ordered afterwards, with one being a Euro V EEV demonstrator of the ASCU class.

HZMB bus operator has ordered 100 K250UBs with Higer body and delivered in 2018.

Indonesia

In 2016, the Jakarta Provincial Government placed orders for 150 Scania K250UB Euro III to replace aging Kopaja and MetroMini fleet. In advantage of the older buses, the Scania K250UB is wheelchair accessible and fitted with air conditioner. It is also expected to reduce air pollution since it fulfills Euro III emission standard. The buses are operated by TransJakarta as MetroTrans, and operated outside the BRT system. Operation started by 2017.

In 2020, Suroboyo Bus purchased eight Scania K250UB Euro III buses bodied with Cityline 3 by Laksana. These units are equipped with bike racks in the front of the bus.

Malaysia

Rapid Bus, a Prasarana Malaysia subsidiary company, currently operates one of the largest fleets of Scania K-series buses, with a total of 830 single-deck K250UB and K270UBs with three different service brands.

Rapid Penang
In 2009, 200 Scania K270UB Euro III units were delivered to Rapid Penang. An additional order for 120 Scania K250UB Euro III units was placed in 2012, all with a total length of 10.7m.

Rapid KL
In 2011, Rapid KL placed an order for 150 Scania K270UB Euro III units. The bodywork and interior of these buses bear a close resemblance to the Euro V units SBS Transit has introduced earlier. Rapid KL placed a follow-up order for 300 units of K250UB Euro III vehicles in 2015.

Rapid Kuantan
Ten units Scania K250UB Euro III have gone into operation in December 2012. A total of 60 units has been purchased. The buses have restyled front and rear as well as a newly developed driver's place.

New Zealand
In New Zealand, several operators have Scania K-series UB urban buses. Because of the additional weight of the 9-litre engine compared to the 7-litre units offered by other manufacturers, many (though not all) Scania urban buses are specified as 6x2 rather than 4x2. This helps reduce the operator's liability for road user charges, which are calculated by vehicle weight. Scania K-series urban buses may have tag axles at lengths where buses of other makes would not, e.g. NZ Bus's 2100 and 2200 series at approximately 12.0 m and only 42 seats.

Scania K-series urban buses pioneered steerable tag axles in New Zealand, which became a requirement for buses between 12.6 m and 13.5 m in length. Because Scania K-series buses had a longer rear overhang than competing makes, the allowable overhang with a steerable tag axle was increased from 4.25 m to 4.5 m. The Scania K280 UB 6x2*4 and K320 UB 6x2*4 have been popular chassis for operators building high-capacity single-deck buses. New Zealand's first double-deck bus in regular urban service was a Gemilang-bodied Scania K310 UD 6x2*4.

Singapore

SBS Transit

SBS Transit currently operates the largest fleet of Scania K-series buses in Singapore, with a total of 1,101 Scania K230UBs.

The company made its first purchase of 500 K230UBs at a cost of S$180 million in early 2007, as part of its scheme to replace most of the ageing fleet and compliance with the new Euro IV emission standards set by local authorities. The single-decker buses are wheelchair accessible and have 2 wheelchair bays each. They are also fitted with 6-speed ZF automatic transmission, bodied by Gemilang Coachwork of Johor, Malaysia with a modified Scania licensed front.

In September 2008, SBS Transit purchased another 400 K230UBs at the cost of S$147 million, with similar features to the first batch of 500. However, these buses had Euro V EEV engine as standard, one wheelchair bay each in favour of extra seating.

SBS Transit made the last order for 200 more K230UBs in August 2009 at a cost of S$72 million.

Early withdrawal
SBS8900B was caught in an accident at Bedok North Bus Depot while on Service 48 in December 2011 and was deregistered and scrapped in April 2013.

SBS8360J was caught in an accident at Jalan Jurong Kechil with a MAN NL323F A22 (SMB1636U) while on Service 157 on 11 May 2018 and was deregistered and parked at Traffic Police Compound. In September 2020, it was reported the bus had been moved to Ulu Pandan Bus Depot for repairs. The bus has been repaired as of September 2021.
	
With the mass influx of surplus buses to SBS Transit for revenue service in November 2021, 97 units of Euro IV K230UBs were taken out of revenue service to be scrapped progressively from January 2022 with the majority of them were APAD-registered and from Ulu Pandan Bus Depot. Like the case of Volvo B10M buses in 2014, these were replaced by newer buses such as Mercedes-Benz O530 Citaro and MAN NL323F single decker buses for cross-border bus services. 20 of these buses were stored at a warehouse in Keppel to be converted into a hotel resort at Changi Village, with the remaining scrapped by July 2022.

Other operators
Singapore Ducktours has 9 Scania K230UBs (3 under 2007, 4 under 2010 and 2 under 2011), configured as open top double-decker buses with bodywork by Soon Chow Corporation for its Hippotours service. All buses were repainted into Big Bus Singapore livery starting from September 2018.

Singapore Changi Airport contracted Woodlands Transport Service Pte Ltd to operate 3 Gemilang-bodied Scania K230UB for its internal shuttle services (Budget Terminal >> Terminal 2). Upon withdrawal of the shuttle services (due to the closure of Budget Terminal), these buses were repainted into SATS gateway livery and are used inside the Airport runway. In addition, a specially configured Scania K230UB (registered as SKP8296X) is used as an "ambulance bus".

Resorts World Sentosa operates a handful of KUBs to provide shuttle services for its hotel guests. These buses were bodied by SC Auto in a coach configuration.

ComfortDelGro Bus also operates a handful of SC Auto-bodied K230UBs, purchased for the National University of Singapore internal shuttle service. Following retirement from NUS duties, these have been repainted and redeployed to other locations such as Sentosa.

Taiwan

Two units of Scania K230UB have been in operation by Ho-Hsin Bus (zh) in Tainan City since 2014, with bodywork by Gemilang Coachworks.

Scania K UD
The K280UD, K310UD and K320UD is the double-decker city bus variant with an 8.9-litre DC9-18 5-cylinder 310 hp Euro IV compliant engine (hence the 310 in K310UD), or a 9.3-litre DC9-29 5-cylinder 280 hp Euro V compliant engine. The 'U' indicates the bus is designed for the urban application, the 'D' points out the chassis is made for a double-decker.

Hong Kong

Kowloon Motor Bus of Hong Kong received two Scania K310UD (complete designation: K310UD6x2EB. The 6x2 shows the bus has a rigid bogie) buses with and ZF 6HP602 gearbox, the rear drive axle has a ratio (differential) of 6.20 and is also a product of ZF. The bus was designed in close co-operation with the body constructor Salvador Caetano (Waterlooville) in order to save weight.

The first one has been registered as MT6551 in March 2007 and entered service on route 104 in August 2007 after testing. The second one has been registered as NE6817 and entered service on route 69X in February 2008.

The K310UD6x2EB is the replacement of the unique K94UB6x2/4LB and also the second type of Scania double-decker bus (the first type is the Scania N113) for KMB.

KMB later ordered a further 20 more units of the K310UD in 2009, they were registered in January 2010.

ASU1 and ASU2 were de-registered in March 2012 and were shipped back to Sweden afterwards.

In March 2011, Citybus received one Scania K280UD (complete designation: K280UD6x2EB) tri-axle double decker. This is the second Scania bus acquired by Citybus, about 10 years after the unique K94UB6x2/4LB was introduced in 2001 (fleet no. 2800). It is equipped with a Euro V compliant Scania DC9-29 engine, rated at 280  hp with maximum torque 1400Nm, both of which are lower than the KMB counterparts (310  hp power output with 1550Nm maximum torque), coupled to a ZF Ecomat 4 6HP604 NBS 6-speed gearbox. It is also bodied by Salvador Caetano, but with some minor changes from KMB ones.

KMB also received two Scania K280UD buses in late 2014 with newly designed Salvador Caetano bodywork. These two buses, like the one purchased by Citybus, are also equipped with Euro V compliant Scania DC9-29 engine. These two buses feature orange Hanover LED destination signs and uses high capacity layout with square staircase. The first bus has been registered as TE7277 with the fleet code ASUD1 in February 2015, with the second one registered as TF6087 with fleet code ASUD2 in March 2015.

New Zealand
Auckland received a K320UD unit with Gemilang Coachwork Sdn Bhd bodywork in February 2013. It entered service on 6 March 2013.

Singapore

SBS Transit received a K310UD demonstrator unit with Gemilang Coachwork SDN BHD bodywork on 26 March 2010. It was registered as SBS7888K. This bus is currently deployed as a training bus at Hougang Depot.

See also

 Scania F series – Series of bus and coach chassis with an engine at the front
 Scania N series – Series of city bus chassis with straight-up, transversely mounted engine at the rear
 Scania 4 series – Bus range introduced in 1997. It is the successor of the 3-series bus range and was superseded by the F, N, and K series
 List of buses

References

 
 Aplicações para Ônibus Scania Brasil June 2012
 Scania K series Scania Thailand October 2011

External links

K series
Bus chassis
Coaches (bus)
Low-floor buses
Low-entry buses
Open-top buses
Double-decker buses
Tri-axle buses
Vehicles introduced in 2006